Hedzer Rijpstra (11 May 1919 – 7 April 2011) was a Dutch politician. He was born in Zelhem and died in Oegstgeest in the age 91.

1919 births
2011 deaths
People from Bronckhorst
Christian Historical Union politicians
20th-century Dutch politicians
Mayors in Drenthe
King's and Queen's Commissioners of Friesland
Mayors in Zeeland
Mayors in Overijssel